Time Warp is the name of an American science fiction comic book anthology series published by DC Comics for five issues from 1979 to 1980. A Time Warp one-shot was published by Vertigo in May 2013.

Publication history
In 1978, DC Comics intended to revive its science-fiction anthology series Strange Adventures. These plans were put on hold that year due to the DC Implosion, a line-wide scaling back of the company's publishing output. When the project was revived a year later, the title was changed to Time Warp and the series was in the Dollar Comics format. The first issue was published with an October–November 1979 cover date. Michael Kaluta provided the cover art for the entire run.

The title featured a mixture of both established comics creators and new talent, such as Dennis O'Neil, Howard Chaykin, Mike Netzer, Arnold Drake, Don Newton, Steve Mitchell, Dick Giordano, Tom Sutton, J.M. DeMatteis, Scott Edelman, Vicatan, Paul Levitz and others. The writing team of Dan Mishkin and Gary Cohn made their comics debut in issue #3 with the three-page short story "On the Day of His Return" which was drawn by Steve Ditko.

Time Warp was canceled with issue #5 (June–July 1980) and unused inventory originally intended for the series was published in a revival of the Mystery in Space title. Other Time Warp stories appeared in the mystery anthology The Unexpected.

A one-shot was published by DC's Vertigo imprint in May 2013. It included a Rip Hunter story by writer Damon Lindelof and artist Jeff Lemire. Other contributors included Tom King, Gail Simone, Peter Milligan, Matt Kindt, Toby Litt and Mark Buckingham.

Collected editions
The Steve Ditko Omnibus Volume 1 includes stories from Time Warp #1–4, 480 pages, September 2011, 
 DC Through the 80s: The End of Eras includes Time Warp #2–3, 520 pages, December 2020, 
 Pulp Fiction Library: Mystery in Space  includes "Brief Encounter" from Time Warp #5, 208 pages, September 1999,

References

External links
 
 
 Time Warp and Time Warp one-shot at Mike's Amazing World of Comics

1979 comics debuts
1980 comics endings
2013 comics debuts
Comics about time travel
Comics anthologies
Comics by Arnold Drake
Comics by Bob Haney
Comics by Dennis O'Neil
Comics by George Kashdan
Comics by Michael Fleisher
Comics by Paul Kupperberg
Comics by Paul Levitz
Comics by Tom King (writer)
DC Comics one-shots
Science fiction comics